The Prizren Incident, also known among German troops as "Bloody Sunday", was a confrontation between German Kosovo Force (KFOR) troops advancing into Kosovo and stragglers from the withdrawing Yugoslav Army. The shootout took place in the city of Prizren, on 13 June 1999. The German troops killed one armed Serb on the spot, while another one died of wounds later. A German soldier was injured by return fire, and there were reports of a woman wounded by Serb snipers.

Background
On 12 June 1999, two days after the approval of UN Security Council Resolution 1244, Kosovo Force (KFOR) personnel began to arrive in Kosovo to stop further hostilities between ethnic Albanians and Serbs and to coordinate efforts to secure the distribution of humanitarian aid.

Arrival of the German troops
In the early hours of 13 June about 100 German soldiers arrived in Prizren from Macedonia to secure the city for another 600 incoming troops that entered at afternoon from Albania,  to the west. Earlier, a Yugoslav Army outpost at Vrbnica border crossing, recently vacated by 60 soldiers, was looted and vandalized. The German soldiers were received as liberators by the ethnic Albanian inhabitants. One of their first tasks was to separate a crowd of Albanian civilians and Yugoslav troops by forming a human line, after the former pelted a convoy of civilian Serbs leaving the city. There was a tense standoff, but eventually a German officer managed to convince the Serbs to withdraw. At the Morinë border crossing, German troops compelled the Serbs to leave the outpost according to schedule when the latter tried to win more time.

Shooting incident
As the German troops drove into downtown, along the Bistrica river, they were met by sniper fire from one of the surrounding hills and some houses; they were also allegedly fired at from a Roman Catholic church. The soldiers took cover and returned fire. A civilian woman was reportedly wounded by the snipers, while the German troops moved to defensive positions below the hill. A German fighting vehicle fired a warning burst with a general-purpose Rheinmetall MG 3 machine gun at a passing Yugoslav army truck after a Yugoslav soldier inside branded an AK-47 assault rifle at a jeering Albanian crowd and fired two shots in the air.

At dusk, a yellow Zastava Skala civilian-type vehicle was seen approaching a German armored carrier outside Hotel Theranda, in the center of the city. The passenger produced an AK-47 and opened fire at the carrier and at bystanders, who fled for safety. The German soldiers in the armored vehicle, supported by a Leopard 2 tank that mounted a roadblock, shot back. Three paratroopers fired at the car with their Heckler & Koch G36 assault rifles, joined by a non-commissioned officer with his 9mm pistol and by turret-mounted 7.62mm machine guns. The combined gunfire killed the driver instantly and critically wounded the shooter. A German soldier in the armored carrier was injured in the arm, becoming the first casualty of the overall peacekeeping operation. The Germans fired a total of 180 rifle rounds and 40 machine-gun rounds. The German firepower was so intense that it pushed the car backward. The passenger eventually died of his wounds. The shooting lasted 20 minutes. The Germans said that the two individuals in the car, both Serbs, were carrying grenades and semi-automatic weapons. 

Platoon leader Lieutenant David Ferk, who gave the order to fire back, was awarded the Gold Cross of Honour for Outstanding Deeds by German Minister of Defense Rudolf Scharping.

Aftermath
The commander of the KFOR brigade in Prizren, General Fritz von Korff said: "Although we may not have everything under control at present, we have enough presence in the town to believe there will be a safe (Yugoslav) withdrawal." He also warned that Prizren was still a "dangerous place".

Armed Serb civilians set an improvised checkpoint outside the town, but it was largely ignored by the Germans, who passed through it several times. The retreating Yugoslav army personnel also manned a number of checkpoints, in violation of the agreement reached with NATO. More than ten days into the arrival of KFOR troops, turmoil and killings among the civilian population continued to spread, to the point that the German commander imposed a curfew from midnight until 5 a.m. 

There were no further incidents with Yugoslav forces, although a Leopard 2A5 tank fired four warning rounds at the town of Orahovac when unrest broke out there on 26 June 1999. This was the first time that a Leopard 2 fired its 120 mm smoothbore gun in anger.

See also 
 Battle of Tetovo
 Kosovo War
 North Kosovo crisis (2011–2013)
 United Nations Interim Administration Mission in Kosovo

References

Kosovo War
Battles involving Germany
Conflicts in 1999
Incidents involving NATO
NATO intervention in the former Yugoslavia
Battles involving FR Yugoslavia
Combat incidents
1999 in Kosovo
June 1999 events in Europe